Jelšovec is a village and municipality in the Lučenec District in the Banská Bystrica Region of Slovakia.

History
In historical records, the village was first mentioned in 1573 (Jelsewcz, Jelsoch). It belonged to Somoskō castle and in the 17th century to Halič. Until the Treaty of Trianon in 1920, it belonged to Hungary and from 1938 to 1945 again.

Genealogical resources

The records for genealogical research are available at the state archive "Statny Archiv in Banska Bystrica, Slovakia"

 Roman Catholic church records (births/marriages/deaths): 1756-1896 (parish B)

See also
 List of municipalities and towns in Slovakia

References

External links
 
 
http://www.e-obce.sk/obec/jelsovec/jelsovec.html
Surnames of living people in Jelsovec

Villages and municipalities in Lučenec District